PLMS may refer to:

 Pine Lake Middle School
 Plantation Middle School, a school.
 Periodic limb movement syndrome, periodic limb movements in sleep or periodic limb movement disorder